Calgary Skyview is a federal electoral district in Alberta, Canada, that has been represented in the House of Commons of Canada since 2015.

Calgary Skyview was created by the 2012 federal electoral boundaries redistribution and was legally defined in the 2013 representation order. It came into effect upon the call of the 42nd Canadian federal election, scheduled for October 2015. It was created out of the electoral district of Calgary Northeast.

Geography
The district consists of the Northeasternmost corner of the city of Calgary. It includes the communities surrounding the Calgary International Airport.

Demographics

According to the Canada 2011 Census

Languages: 50.0% English, 16.7% Punjabi, 6.5% Urdu, 4.4% Tagalog, 3.7% Chinese, 2.7% Spanish, 1.7% Arabic, 1.5% Vietnamese, 1.4% Hindi, 1.2% Persian, 1.2% French, 1.0% Bengali, 8.0% Other
Religions: 42.4% Christian, 16.3% Sikh, 14.3% Muslim, 4.5% Hindu, 2.2% Buddhist, 0.5% Other, 19.8% None
Median income: $30,961 (2010) 
Average income: $37,064 (2010)

Members of Parliament

This riding has elected the following members of the House of Commons of Canada:

Election results

References

Alberta federal electoral districts
Politics of Calgary